The 1921–22 Irish Cup was the 42nd edition of the premier knock-out cup competition in Northern Irish football. 

Linfield won the tournament for the 14th time, defeating Glenavon 2–1 in the final at The Oval. This was the first edition of the tournament in which teams solely from Northern Ireland could participate.

Results

Quarter-finals

|}

Replay

|}

Second replay

|}

Semi-finals

|}

Final

References

External links
 Northern Ireland Cup Finals. Rec.Sport.Soccer Statistics Foundation (RSSSF)

Irish Cup seasons
1921–22 domestic association football cups
1921–22 in Northern Ireland association football